The architecture of Uzbekistan is noted for its originality. Many consider Uzbekistan’s architecture to be notable despite the changing economic conditions, technological advances, demographic fluctuations, and cultural shifts that the country has experienced.

Notable architectural centers of Uzbekistan include Samarkand, Bukhara, Khiva, Shakhrisabz, Termez, and Kokand. Various ancient architectural masterpieces have also survived, including palaces, mausoleums, mosques, and minarets. Colorful mosaics, religious symbols, and abstract geometrical patterns also characterize architecture in Uzbekistan.

Archaeological research on Central Asia has revealed architectural trends running parallel to the Acheulean era. In fact, remains of monuments from both the Stone and Bronze Ages have been found in the Surkhandarya, Tashkent, Samarkand, Fergana, and Navoi regions of the country. During the Middle Ages, Uzbek architecture flourished as a result of being a central link in the  Silk Road. Timurid-period architecture from the 14th to 16th century, as well as the architecture of the Shaybanid era in the 16th century, contributed greatly to the development of Islamic architecture. In the 21st century, Uzbek architecture has been characterized by its balance of traditional design and modern innovation.

Pre-Islamic architecture 

The earliest traces of human habitation in the area of Uzbekistan date back to the Paleolithic Era. Ancient settlements prove that the earliest architecture can be found in Sapallitepa (14th–17th centuries BC) and Jarkutan (9th–14th centuries BC). Buddhist monuments, namely Fayaz Tepe and Kara Tepe, have also been found in the Surhandarya region (1st–3rd centuries AD). Each of these sites reflect the different stages of Central Asian civilization.

The ancient city of Khorezm is a significant factor in Uzbek architecture. Khorezm was established 982 years before Alexander the Great invaded Central Asia, over 34 centuries ago. Settlements of ancient Khorezm antiquity are defined by notable architecture, such as Janbaskala (4th century BC), Koi Krilgankala (2nd century BC–4th century AD), Toprakkala (1st century BC–6th century AD) and Ayazkala (2nd century BC, in the territory of Republic of Karakalpakstan).

Islamic architecture 
Bukhara, Samarkand, and Khiva played a vital role in the influence of Middle Ages architecture in Uzbekistan. For instance, palaces of the rulers, aristocratic places of residence, market places, madrasas, and mausoleums are confirmed as exceptional architectural examples.

The Kyrk-Kyz 
The Kyrk-Kyz ("Forty Girls") mansion in Termez, dating back to the 9th and 10th centuries, is a fine example of an original country manor. The Samanids Mausoleum in Bukhara still stands as a fine architectural building from the period of the early Middle Ages.

Registan 

In the 11th and 12th centuries, Samarkand became one of the major cities in the region. The public square in Registan was termed "the noblest public square in the world" by Lord Curzon, and it remains the main artwork and heart of the ancient city.

Registan is framed by three madrasas (Islamic schools) of distinctive Islamic architecture: the Ulugh Beg Madrasah (1417–1420), the Tilla-Kari Madrasah (1646–1660), and the Sher-Dar Madrasah (1619–1636).

The Ulugh Beg Madrasa was built in the Timurid Empire era of Timur, known as Tamerlane. The madrasa features a lancet-arch (pishtaq), or main square entrance. High minarets highlight each corner. There is a mosaic panel over the entrance arch, which was decorated by geometrical, stylized ornaments. The building consists of a mosque and lecture rooms, specialized for student use. The walls have magnificent art galleries along the axes.

The Sher-Dar and Tilya-Kori madrasas were built in the 17th century. Tiger mosaics appear on the face of each madrasa.

The Sher Dar Madrasa has unique features including figures of lions, tigers, deer, and human faces. These are not only paintings, but also special symbols of power according to the perceptions of Islam. The beauty of the combination of the grand portal, decorated pillars, and other masterpieces is impossible to truly capture in photographs and can only be hinted at.

The Tilya-Kori Madrasa (meaning "gold-covered") is known as the last, largest, and most glorious structure of the Registan Square. The Tilla-Kari madrasa includes a 120-meter-long façade, relieving the square's oppressive symmetrical axis. The composition of minarets at the corners gives strength to the architecture of the madrasa. Exterior scenes are enriched by poly-chromatic tiles with geometric patterns. At the center, a tall pishtaq enables each façade to be more glorious.

The architecture of Temur's period captures the 13th century well. In particular, strong castles symbolized strong government, the authority, and victory of the Islamic civilization, while marketplaces and living quarters symbolized the role of trade and the essence of complex urban life.

Bibi-Khanym Mosque 

One of the greatest monuments of Uzbek architecture is the Bibi-Khanym Mosque. It has 115 feet high portals, 165-foot minarets, 400 cupolas, and a large courtyard. The gates are made of seven different metals, and the building itself is made of marble and terracotta, and is decorated with mosaics and blue-gold frescoes.

The period of the Timurid dynasty (14th to the 16th century) and the Shaybanid era (16th century) is famous for its colorful architectural designs, such as turquoise-colored domes, exemplified by the dome of the Gur-e-Amir (Timur's mausoleum in Samarkand).

19th century 
At the end of the 19th century and the beginning of the 20th century, residential architecture began to focus around ordinary Uzbek citizens. Everyday buildings reflect historical background as well as local and modern conditions of the region. For instance, a house in Bukhara may have a closed character and may be isolated from the street noise and dust. Its isolated rooms may be built according to the climate, creating unique micro-climates suitable for both heat and cold. Another example is Khiva, which has a high terrace opened to the wind to promote favorable micro-climates in houses. In Ferghana, houses have sliding walls and shutters and are frequently decorated with niches, ganch (wooden architecture), and other features. Although simple in design, residential architecture throughout the country is often rational, yet shows the originality of Uzbek culture.

In conclusion, special features of Uzbek architecture harmonize traditional design, original structures, and innovative consideration of micro-climates. The cities of Tashkent, Samarkand, Bukhara and Khiva are famous for fantastic architectural ensembles such as Khazrat Imam, Registan, Lyabi Khaus, and Ichan Kala.

See also 

 Architecture of Central Asia

References

External links 
Middle ages checked 29 March 2016
Article checked 29 March 2016
Minaret of Kutlug-Timur checked 29 March 2016 
Sher-Dar Madrasah checked 29 March 2016
About Registan checked 29 March 2016

 
Uzbekistani culture
Architectural history